{{Speciesbox
| image =
| status = LC
| status_system = IUCN3.1
| status_ref = 
| genus = Metlapilcoatlus
| species = occiduus
| authority = (Hoge, 1966)
| synonyms = * Bothrops affinis Bocourt, 1868
 Bothriopsis affinis – Cope, 1871
 Trigonocephalus affinis – Garman, 1884
 Bothrops nummifer affinis – Stuart, 1963
 Bothrops nummifer occiduus Hoge, 1966 (replacement name for Bothrops affinis Bocourt, 1868)
 Bothrops nummifer occiduus – Hoge & Romano-Hoge, 1981
 Porthidium nummifer occiduum – Campbell & Lamar, 1989
}}Common names: Guatemalan jumping pitviper.

Metlapilcoatlus occiduus is a venomous pitviper subspecies endemic to southern Mexico, Guatemala, and El Salvador.

Description
Adults are usually  in total length. The build is very stout, although not so much as that of M. mexicanus.

Geographic range
Found in southern Mexico (southeastern Chiapas), southern and central Guatemala, and western El Salvador. The type locality given is "Saint-Augustín (Guatemala), versant occidentale de la Córdillère. 610 mètres [2,000 ft] d´altitude". Actually, San Augustín is on the southern slope of Volcán Atitlán.

Habitat
Its habitat includes subtropical wet forest on the Pacific versant from southeastern Chiapas, Mexico to western El Salvador. It also inhabits the pine-oak forest near Guatemala City.

Taxonomy
Regarded as a full species, Metlapilcoatlus occiduus, by Campbell and Lamar (2004).

References

Further reading
 Hoge, A.R. 1966. Preliminary account on Neotropical Crotalinae (Serpentes: Viperidae). Memórias do Instituto Butantan 32 [1965]: 109–184.

External links
 

occiduus
Reptiles of Guatemala
Reptiles of Mexico
Reptiles of El Salvador
Reptiles of Central America
Reptiles described in 1966
Taxobox binomials not recognized by IUCN